Brian Hardman is a former association football player who represented New Zealand at international level.

Hardman made his full All Whites debut in a 2–4 loss to New Caledonia on 18 July 1971 and ended his international playing career with 9 A-international caps and 1 goal to his credit, his final cap an appearance in a 0–1 loss to Indonesia on 18 March 1975.

References

External links

Year of birth missing (living people)
Living people
New Zealand association footballers
New Zealand international footballers
Association football midfielders
1973 Oceania Cup players